Thizy may refer to:

Thizy, Rhône, a commune in the French region of Rhône-Alpes
Thizy, Yonne, a commune in the French region of Bourgogne